
Year 479 BC was a year of the pre-Julian Roman calendar. At the time, it was known as the Year of the Consulship of Vibulanus and Rutilus (or, less frequently, year 275 Ab urbe condita). The denomination 479 BC for this year has been used since the early medieval period, when the Anno Domini calendar era became the prevalent method in Europe for naming years.

Events 
 By place 

 Greece 
 The Persian commander Mardonius, now based in Thessaly, wins support from Argus and western Arcadia. He tries to win over Athens but fails.
 Mardonius attacks Athens once more and the Athenians are forced to retreat, whereupon he razes the city. The Spartans march north to support Athens against the Persians.
 August 27
 The Battle of Plataea in Boeotia ends the Persian invasions of Greece as the Persian general Mardonius is routed by the Greeks under Pausanias, nephew of the former Spartan King, Leonidas I. The Athenian contingent is led by the repatriated Aristides. Mardonius is killed in the battle and the Greeks capture enormous amounts of loot. Thebes is captured shortly thereafter and the Theban collaborators executed by Pausanias.
 Meanwhile at sea, the Persians are defeated by a Greek fleet headed by Leotychidas of Sparta and Xanthippus of Athens in the Battle of Mycale, on the coast of Ionia in Asia Minor.
 Potidaea is struck by a tsunami.
 In 479 BC, when Persian soldiers besieged the Greek city of Potidaea, the tide retreated much farther than usual, leaving a convenient invasion route. But this wasn't a stroke of luck. Before they had crossed halfway, the water returned in a wave higher than anyone had ever seen, drowning the attackers. The Potiidaeans believed they had been saved by the wrath of Poseidon. But what really saved them was likely the same phenomenon that has destroyed countless others: a tsunami.

Rome 
 The Roman consul Caeso Fabius proposed an agrarian law to distribute land won in recent wars amongst the plebs, but this was rejected by the senate.
 Ongoing hostilities between Rome and the Aequi.  No major battle is fought.  
 Ongoing hostilities between Rome and Veii. The family of the Fabii requests and is granted sole responsibility for the war, and the Fabii march from Rome, establishing a fortified camp at the Cremera.

Births

Deaths 
 August 27: Mardonius, Persian general (killed in the Battle of Plataea)
 Confucius, Chinese philosopher (b. 551 BC)

References